The Cedar Grove School is a historic one-room schoolhouse located at 4216 County Route 516 in Old Bridge Township of Middlesex County, New Jersey. Built in 1885, it was added to the National Register of Historic Places on October 24, 1976 for its significance in education and community history. Since 1964, the building has been the Thomas Warne Museum, run by the Madison–Old Bridge Township Historical Society.

See also
 National Register of Historic Places listings in Middlesex County, New Jersey
 List of museums in New Jersey

References

External links
 

Old Bridge Township, New Jersey
One-room schoolhouses in New Jersey
National Register of Historic Places in Middlesex County, New Jersey
School buildings on the National Register of Historic Places in New Jersey
New Jersey Register of Historic Places
School buildings completed in 1885
1885 establishments in New Jersey